Boiga thackerayi, or Thackeray's cat snake, is arboreal, mostly seen close to forest streams, and is active during the night. It is rear fanged and is known to grow up to three feet in length. It is  endemic to the Western Ghats, India.It has the widest distribution among the endemic Cat snake of western ghats.It can be found from Maharashtra to agastyamalai-kalakkad range.

Etymology
The epithet, thackerayi, is in honor of Indian conservationist and wildlife researcher Tejas Thackeray.

Geographic range
Boiga thackerayi is described from Koyna region of Satara district in western Maharashtra, India.

It can be found from the mid-high elevation of western ghats in the States of Maharashtra,goa, karnataka, tamilnadu and Kerala.

Diet
It feeds on eggs of Humayun's night frog (Nyctibatrachus humayuni). This behavior was never reported in cat snakes from the Western Ghats earlier.

References

thackerayi
Snakes of India
Endemic fauna of the Western Ghats
Reptiles described in 2019
Taxa named by Varad B. Giri